Iratxoak (sing.: iratxo) are the imps of Basque mythology. Usually benevolent, they help with farming labors in the night if given presents of food. Galtxagorriak are a specific kind of iratxoak. Their name means the red-pants. 

Basque mythology
Basque legendary creatures